Aowin-Amenfi District is a former district council that was located in Western Region, Ghana. Originally created as an district council in 1975. However on 1988, it was split off into two new district assemblies: Wassa Amenfi District (capital: Asankragua) and Aowin/Suaman District (capital: Enchi). The district council was located in the northern part of Western Region and had Asankragua as its capital town.

References

Districts of the Western Region (Ghana)